Paul Lafrance is a television personality on HGTV Canada. He is from Ajax, Ontario, Canada, with his business located in Pickering, Ontario.
 
Lafrance has been a host on several shows, including Decked Out, Deck Wars, and is a celebrity judge on the second season of Canada's Handyman Challenge. He is also slated to host Disaster Deck, a new series that HGTV is still casting homeowners with deck problems to participate in.

Biography
Lafrance owns local Pickering, Ontario building company Cutting Edge Construction and Design. Lafrance is also the owner/operator and CEO of Paul Lafrance Design, which specializes in high-end custom deck designs servicing North America.

Lafrance's company has made a name for itself by generating innovative and state-of-the-art custom deck designs for over 15 years. He has successfully designed and built over one thousand five hundred decks across Southern Ontario.

Lafrance is also known for his love of music and composition. HGTV describes his background as both a musician and a deck builder as an edge that gives him the creativity needed to offer the one-of-a-kind deck concepts that transform backyards over the years. Lafrance has said, “You don’t need to be a musician to know a good song when you hear one, it’s all about how it makes you feel. A good backyard retreat is all about emotional response rather than just assembling sticks of wood!”

He was offered his own television show after doing a miracle makeover segment on Breakfast Television. The show, Decked Out follows Lafrance and his decking company to jobs where Lafrance attempts to make a mini oasis for people in their backyard. While filming Decked Out, Lafrance completed work on Deck Wars, a reality game show that pits two teams against each other with Lafrance presiding over as judge.

Lafrance describes himself as easily bored and a "counter-culture guy". He says his philosophy around decking comes from a war vet friend who told him decks were places of rest in a crazy world. Lafrance struggled in school, ultimately dropping out, and was told to go into the trades. He is known for being energetic and at one point was working on Decked Out and Deck Wars while developing Disaster Deck.

Lafrance is also a musician and earned some renown in the Christian music scene in Ontario. He was a musician before he was a carpenter. His band, Found in the Fury, released Songs from the Cave in 2012.

His work has been featured on several Holmes on Homes, Breakfast Television, and Holmes Inspection. 

In a television interview concerning the opening of his new art gallery, L'Artisan, in the Nautical Village of Pickering, Ontario, he discussed and highlighted the work of the Loran Award-winning artist Raine Storey, whose work will be featured at the gallery..

Filmography
 Decked Out 
 Deck Wars — host
 Canada's Handyman Challenge — judge
 House of Bryan — guest star, deck builder
 Disaster Decks
 Home to Win — guest builder
 Custom Built

See also
 Mike Holmes
 Bryan Baeumler
 Scott McGillivray

References

External links
Paul Lafrance Design

1974 births
Living people
Canadian television hosts
Canadian performers of Christian music
People from Pickering, Ontario
Place of birth missing (living people)